Robin Singh  (born 1 January 1970) is a former Indian cricketer who played one Test match in 1999. He currently serves as one of the cricket experts for All India Radio and as an income tax inspector for ITO, New Delhi. He was also contracted as Mumbai Indians' fielding coach in the Indian Premier League.

His sole Test match was against New Zealand in 1999 at Hamilton as a replacement for Ajit Agarkar. He has represented Delhi in the Ranji Trophy, with his best performances including a 10-wicket haul for Delhi in a Ranji Trophy game. He also vice-captained the Delhi Ranji team for some time. He was also part of the India A team against West Indies at Bangalore. He retired from first class cricket in 2004.

References

1970 births
Indian cricketers
India Test cricketers
North Zone cricketers
Delhi cricketers
Living people